Vicki Whitelaw (born 2 January 1977) is a road cyclist from Australia. She participated at the 2008, 2009, 2010 and 2011 UCI Road World Championships.

References

External links
 profile at Procyclingstats.com

1977 births
Australian female cyclists
Living people
Place of birth missing (living people)